"All the King's Men" was an American television play broadcast in two parts by NBC on May 14 and 21, 1958, as part of the television series, Kraft Television Theatre. It was written by Don Mankiewicz based on the 1946 novel by Robert Penn Warren. Sidney Lumet was the director, and the cast was led by Neville Brand as Willie Stark and Maureen Stapleton as Sadie Burke.

Plot
Based on Robert Penn Warren's 1946 novel, the production depicts the political rise of Willie Stark as he becomes governor and runs for the U.S. Senate.

Cast
The cast included performances by:

 Neville Brand as Willie Stark
 Maureen Stapleton as Sadie Burke
 Fred J. Scollay as Jack Burden
 Nancy Marchand as Ann
 Richard Kiley
 Frank Conroy as The Judge
 Robert Emhardt
 William Prince
 Tim Hovey

Production

Reception
Maureen Stapleton was nominated for an Emmy Award for best single performance by an actress.

Stapleton and Neville Brand won the outstanding performance awards by an actress and actor at the 1958 Sylvania Television Awards. The production was also nominated as the outstanding telecast of 1958, losing out to Little Moon of Alban.

References

1958 American television episodes
1958 television plays
Works about assassinations
Kraft Television Theatre